The office of Deputy Prime Minister of the Faroe Islands (Faroese: varaløgmaður) is held by one of the ministers of the Faroese government. The deputy prime minister is acting as prime minister when the prime minister is on leave.

See also 

Politics of the Faroe Islands
List of prime ministers of the Faroe Islands

References

External links 
web.archive.org (copy from an older version of the website tinganes.fo), list of Faroese governments since 1948

Lists of political office-holders in the Faroe Islands
Deputy Prime Ministers of the Faroe Islands
Politics of the Faroe Islands
Faroes